Massachusetts's 8th congressional district is located in eastern Massachusetts, including part of Boston. It is represented by Democrat Stephen Lynch. For one congressional term (1791–1793), it served as the home district of the District of Maine. The district boundaries were significantly changed, as of the elections of 2012, due to redistricting after the 2010 census, with the old 8th district largely being shifted to the new 7th district. The new 8th district comprises many of the communities of the old 9th district, as well as some easternmost Norfolk County communities and northernmost Plymouth County communities of the old 10th district.

This district has the distinction of being the only one ever represented by someone who had previously served as president of the United States, as John Quincy Adams held this office after leaving the presidency from 1843 until his death in 1848.

Election results from presidential races

Cities and towns in the district

Previous

Current 
In Bristol County: Precincts 1 and 2 in Raynham.

In Norfolk County: Avon, Braintree, Canton, Cohasset, Dedham, Holbrook, Milton:Precincts 2–4, and 6–9, Norwood, Quincy, Stoughton, Walpole, Westwood and Weymouth.

In Plymouth County: Abington, Bridgewater, Brockton, East Bridgewater, Hingham, Hull, Scituate, West Bridgewater, and Whitman.

In Suffolk County: Boston, Ward 3: Precincts 1–6; Ward 5: Precincts 3–5, 11; Ward 6, Ward 7: Precincts 1–9, Ward 11: Precincts 9 and 10, Ward 13: Precincts 3, 7 and 10, Ward 16: Precincts 2, 5, 7, 9, 10 and 12, Ward 19: Precincts 1–6, 8 and 9, and Ward 20: Precincts 1, 2, and 4–20.

List of members representing the district

Recent election results

References

 Congressional Biographical Directory of the United States 1774–present

External links

Maps 
 Map of Massachusetts's 8th Congressional District, via Massachusetts Secretary of the Commonwealth

Election results 
CNN.com 2004 election results
CNN.com 2006 election results

08
Government of Norfolk County, Massachusetts
Government of Middlesex County, Massachusetts
Government of Suffolk County, Massachusetts
Constituencies established in 1789
1789 establishments in Massachusetts